Rimpi Das is an Indian actress and model, who appears in Assamese cinema and Hindi television serials. She has appeared in many Assamese movies which includes national award-winning films like Ajeyo and Mon Jaai. She has also done Assamese VCD films like Uroniya Mon, Phaguni, Jonaki Mon etc. This beautiful actress made her Kollywood debut through Pali directed by A.Jesudoss.

Career 
Rimpi Das made her acting debut in the 2004 Assamese film Monot Birinar Jui directed by Ashok Kumar Bishaya. In 2010, Rimpi Das entered into the mobile theatre industry of Assam through Kohinoor Theatre. She started her Hindi television career in BIG Magic's popular Hindi serial Akbar Birbal, where she played the role of Anarkali along with well known Hindi television actors like Kiku Sharda, Vishal Kotian and Delnaaz Irani.

She has also portrayed the supporting role of Parvati in Indian epic series Siya Ke Ram along with Rohit Bakshi in Star Plus and in another Indian epic television series of Colors, Mahakali– Anth hi Aarambh hai where she played the character of Devi Ganga.

Personal life 
Rimpi is the eldest of three siblings. Her younger brother Gunjan Bhardwaj is also a popular actor of Assamese film and television industry.

Filmography

Film

Television

References

External links
 

Actresses from Assam
Actresses in Assamese cinema
21st-century Indian actresses
Indian film actresses
Indian television actresses
Living people
Year of birth missing (living people)